William Wilshere (1806 – 10 November 1867) was a British  Whig politician who sat in the House of Commons from 1837 to 1847.

Life
He was the son of Thomas Wilshere of The Frythe and his wife Lora, daughter of Charles Beaumont of Houghton, Huntingdonshire. He was educated at Bedford grammar school, and Wadham College, Oxford. He inherited an estate from his uncle William Wilshere, who died in 1824, and who had adopted him while still young.

Wilshere was a landed proprietor and banker of Hertford. He was elected as the Member of Parliament (MP) for Great Yarmouth at the 1837 general election. He held the seat until 1847.

Wilshere lived at The Frythe, near Welwyn and in 1846 had a Gothic revival mansion built to the design of Thomas Smith and Edward Blore. In 1858, he became High Sheriff of Hertfordshire.
 
He died unmarried at the age of 61. The Frythe passed to his younger brother Charles Willes Wilshere.

References

External links

1806 births
1867 deaths
Members of the Parliament of the United Kingdom for English constituencies
UK MPs 1837–1841
UK MPs 1841–1847
High Sheriffs of Hertfordshire
Whig (British political party) MPs for English constituencies
People from Welwyn
Politics of the Borough of Great Yarmouth